Shanghai Pearl Studio Film and Television Technology Co., Ltd, doing business as Pearl Studio, formerly known as Oriental DreamWorks, the trade name of Shanghai Oriental DreamWorks Film & Television Technology Co., Ltd., is a Chinese animation film production company owned by CMC Capital Partners. The company was founded as a Chinese-American joint venture in 2012 by DreamWorks Animation and Chinese investment companies. The company mainly produces Chinese-themed animated and live-action films and their derivatives for distribution within China and worldwide. In 2018, CMC (China Media Capital) acquired NBCUniversal's stake in the studio.

History

On February 17, 2012, DreamWorks Animation announced a joint venture with China Media Capital, Shanghai Media Group and Shanghai Alliance Investment to build a Shanghai based family entertainment company named Shanghai Oriental DreamWorks Film & Television Technology Co., Ltd. or Oriental DreamWorks for short. The new venture was expected to develop and produce original Chinese animated and live-action content for distribution within China and worldwide. The company also produces live entertainment content, theme parks, games and consumer products. Oriental DreamWorks, owned 45% by DWA and 55% by the Chinese partners, launched on August 6, 2012, with the cash and intellectual capital worth $350 million. To produce animated films, 37 Entertainment, a Chinese animation studio with 175 employees, which had already worked on some of DWA's television productions, has been acquired.

Beside producing its own content, Oriental DreamWorks acts also as a distributor for DWA's productions. Releasing The Croods in 2013, ODW became the first company in 20–30 years that got a license to import Western films.

On November 25, 2015, Peilin Chou was appointed as the head of creative for feature animation at Oriental DreamWorks.

The studio's first animated feature film, Kung Fu Panda 3, was released on January 29, 2016, and was made in co-production with DWA, with 1/3 of the film being produced in China. The studio's first original film, titled Abominable, followed in 2019. On March 15, 2017, it was reported that NBCUniversal would sell off its stake in Oriental DreamWorks for restructuring and possibly face problems with Chinese antitrust investigation.

A film adaption of The Tibet Code, co-produced by China Film Group, was announced, but was cancelled.

On September 26, 2017, Peilin Chou was promoted to the role of Chief Creative Officer.

On February 1, 2018, CMC Capital Partners announced that they have taken the full ownership of Oriental DreamWorks and renamed it as Pearl Studio. Universal Pictures and DreamWorks Animation still continued to collaborate with Pearl Studio for Abominable in 2019. Frank Zhu was appointed CEO.

On September 29, 2019, it was reported that Abominable grossed $30 million worldwide during its opening weekend.

Productions

Feature films

Distributor in China

Additional Production Work

Production Company

In Development

Dream Center

Part of the deal with the Chinese partners was also an entertainment and culture complex called Dream Center. Built in Shanghai with an investment exceeding $2.7 billion, it would feature series of theatres, cinemas, shopping areas, galleries, hotels, restaurants and the world's largest IMAX screen, and was expected to open in 2017 (may be delayed). As of May 2017, the future of the Dream Center is unknown, and has most likely been scrapped.

See also
 Pacific Data Images
 DreamWorks Animation
 Kung Fu Panda (franchise)
 Netflix Animation

References

External links
 

Chinese animation studios
Film production companies of China
Entertainment companies established in 2012
Companies based in Shanghai
Xuhui District
Chinese companies established in 2012
DreamWorks Animation
2018 mergers and acquisitions